Notre Dame du Bon Succès is a wooden statue of the Madonna and Child in the church of Notre Dame du Finistère in Brussels. Copies of this statue are known as Our Lady of Aberdeen in Scotland. The statue came to Brussels in 1625. It is believed that it was sent by William Laing, the Procurer for the King of Spain, from Aberdeen to Dunkirk. Its history before 1625 is based on uncertain records, but after that date its story is well documented.

The statue is made from oak and walnut. There is evidence of repairs from X-ray computed tomography (CT) scanning. Copies of it were made in 1895 for the Catholic cathedral in Aberdeen and the Convent of the Sacred Heart at Queen's Cross, Aberdeen. It is believed that the Brussels statue came from a chapel at the north end of the Bridge of Dee in Aberdeen which was built between 1527 and 1530. Many myths and miracles have been associated with Notre Dame du Bon Succès. See McAleese (2013) below.

References

Buyle, A. (2008). L'église Notre-Dame du Finistère à Bruxelles aux XVIIIe et XIXe Siècles: Redécouvertes et documents inédits, Collection Investigations 1, Inédits publiés par la Societé Royale d’Archeologie de Bruxelles, Editions Nauwelaerts.

Descamps, J. B. Voyage pittoresque de la Flandre et du Brabant, avec des réflexions relativement aux arts & quelques gravures (Zwemmer, Rouen, 1759).

Gyselinx, A.  Hauts lieux de dévotion mariale: Notre Dame du Finistère. Notre Dame au Coeur d'Or 64.2 (March–April, 62–5, 1997).

Smith, R. (2013). Our Lady of Aberdeen – the Statue in Exile: the remarkable story of the survival of this unique statue 

McAleese, R.  Notre Dame Du Bon Succès or Our Lady of Aberdeen – a Pre-Reformation Statue from Scotland?, "Records of the Scottish Church History Society", 2013.

Unknown. (1726) Histoire de L'Image Miraculeuse de la Très-Sainte Vierge Marie, sous le titre de Notre-Dame de Bon Succès (Louis Varle, Tournay, 1726). (Based on the archives of Bartelemi de los Rios).

Unknown. (1854) Histoire de la Statue Miraculeuse de la Très-Sainte Vierge Marie; honorée dans l'église de Notre-Dame de Finisterre à Bruxelles sous le titre de Notre-Dame de Bon-Succès (De H Goemaere, Brussels, 1854).

See also
Hospitals in medieval Scotland

Tourist attractions in Brussels
Statues in Belgium
Statues of the Madonna and Child
Catholic Church in Belgium